The Scott's Woods Historic District is a historic district on Hillside Street between Randolph Avenue and the Blue Hills Reservation in Milton, Massachusetts.  This rural-residential area has a long history, and is named for the Scott family, who were early settlers of the area.  The oldest house in the district, the First Period Bernard Capen House, was moved here in 1909.  Two houses built in the district in the mid-18th century survive.  The district is otherwise reflective of Milton's growth from a rural community to a mainly residential suburb of adjacent Boston.

The district was listed on the National Register of Historic Places in 1992.

See also
National Register of Historic Places listings in Milton, Massachusetts

References

Historic districts in Norfolk County, Massachusetts
Georgian architecture in Massachusetts
Milton, Massachusetts
National Register of Historic Places in Milton, Massachusetts
Historic districts on the National Register of Historic Places in Massachusetts